Artyom Vyacheslavovich Kosov (born 4 August 1986) is a Russian rower who won three medals at the European championships in 2011–2015. He was disqualified from competing in the quadruple sculls at the 2016 Summer Olympics after his teammate Sergey Fedorovtsev failed a drug test in 2016.

References 

1986 births
Russian male rowers
Rowers at the 2016 Summer Olympics
Olympic rowers of Russia
Living people
European Rowing Championships medalists